Little Crawl Key is an island in the middle Florida Keys. It lies adjacent to Crawl Key, and the two islands are separated by a cove.

References

Islands of the Florida Keys
Islands of Monroe County, Florida
Islands of Florida